Zenón Noriega Agüero (July 12, 1900 – May 7, 1957) was a Peruvian army general who briefly served as the Interim President of Peru through a military junta for two months in 1950.

Biography 
Noriega was born in Cajamarca in 1900 as the son of Wenceslao Noriega and María del Carmen Agüero. He served as Manuel A. Odría's deputy since Odría took power in a military coup in 1948. On June 1, 1950, Odría formally stepped down as president in order to pursue his candidacy in a presidential election in which he would be the only candidate. Noriega became president of the Junta until July 28, when Odría resumed power. Political historians concede that Noriega did not rule on his own, but followed Odría's commands. He was immediately appointed Prime Minister by Odría, and served in that position until August 1954.

Already enshrined as constitutional president Odría after a questionable election, Noriega continued to serve as Minister of War and President of the Council of Ministers. He was promoted to Major General in 1953. Shortly after he was accused of organizing a plot to depose Odría, he was sent into exile aboard one of the navy ships (August 1954). It was said the conspiracy involved important people, being a symptom of the degree of decomposition in the Odriist regime.

Noriega went to Argentina, where he was received by President Juan Domingo Perón. Two years later he returned to Peru and retired to private life. He died in 1957.

External links
  Speech to the Peruvian Congress on July 28th, 1950

1900 births
1957 deaths
Peruvian generals
Prime Ministers of Peru
Presidents of Peru
Vice presidents of Peru
Peruvian prisoners and detainees
Prisoners and detainees of Peru